The 2003–04 NBA season was the Jazz's 30th in the National Basketball Association. Without their dynamic duo of John Stockton and Karl Malone, not much was expected out of the Jazz entering the season. However, with young stars like Andrei Kirilenko picking up the slack while being selected for the 2004 NBA All-Star Game, the Jazz were competitive all season. With the exception of a slump in January and February, the Jazz remained above .500 all season as they battled the Denver Nuggets for the final playoff spot in the Western Conference. The Jazz finished last place in the Midwest Division with a 42–40 record, and failed to qualify for the playoffs for the first time in twenty-one seasons. Their 42–40 record was their nineteenth consecutive winning season, a record which stood until the San Antonio Spurs broke it with their 20th consecutive winning season in 2016-17.

Following the season, Greg Ostertag signed as a free agent with the Sacramento Kings.

Draft picks

Roster

Regular season

Season standings

Record vs. opponents

Player statistics

Season

Awards and records
 Andre Kirilenko, NBA All-Defensive Second Team

Transactions

References

Utah Jazz seasons
Utah
Utah
Utah